Marko Meerits (born 26 April 1992) is an Estonian professional footballer who currently plays as a goalkeeper for Nõmme Kalju and the Estonia national team.

Club career

Flora
Meerits came through the Flora youth system. He moved to Esiliiga club Warrior on loan for the 2008 season. Meerits made his debut in the Meistriliiga on 15 May 2010, in a 2–1 win over Kuressaare. He made 10 appearances in the 2010 season as Flora won their eighth Meistriliiga title. In the Estonian Supercup on 1 March 2011, Meerits kept a clean sheet against Levadia for 120 minutes, eventually winning the match 5–3 in a penalty shootout by saving Konstantin Nahk's attempt and converting a penalty himself.

Vitesse
On 7 July 2011, Meerits signed a three-year contract with Dutch Eredivisie club Vitesse. He made his debut in the Eredivisie on 7 August 2011, when he came on as a 21st-minute substitute replacing the injured Eloy Room and kept a clean sheet in a 0–0 away draw against ADO Den Haag.

Flora (loan)
On 25 February 2013, Meerits returned to Flora on a five-month loan until the end of July.

FC Emmen
On 4 July 2014, Meerits signed a two-year contract with Dutch Eerste Divisie club FC Emmen. In his first season with FC Emmen, he conceded 51 goals in 36 Eerste Divisie matches. In the 2015–16 season, Meerits was sidelined by a knee injury.

Tarvas
On 30 August 2016, Meerits joined Meistriliiga club Tarvas until the end of the 2016 season.

VPS
On 27 January 2017, Meerits joined Finnish Veikkausliiga club VPS on a one-year deal with an option to extend the contract for another year. He made his debut in the Veikkausliiga on 5 April 2017, HJK.

Narva Trans
On 16 February 2019, Meerits signed a one-year contract with Meistriliiga club Narva Trans. On 25 May 2019, he captained the team in a 2–1 extra-time victory over Nõmme Kalju in the Estonian Cup final.

International career
Meerits has represented Estonia at under-17, under-18, under-19, under-21 and under-23 levels.

On 14 December 2010, Meerits was named by manager Tarmo Rüütli in the Estonia squad to face China PR and Qatar in friendly matches. He made his senior debut for Estonia on 18 December 2010, replacing Pavel Londak in the 89th minute of a 0–3 away loss to China PR.

Career statistics

Club

International

Honours

Club
Flora
Meistriliiga: 2010
Estonian Cup: 2010–11, 2012–13
Estonian Supercup: 2011

Narva Trans
Estonian Cup: 2018–19

Individual
Estonian Young Footballer of the Year: 2011, 2013

References

External links

1992 births
Living people
People from Viimsi Parish
Estonian footballers
Association football goalkeepers
Esiliiga players
FC Warrior Valga players
Meistriliiga players
FC Flora players
JK Tarvas Rakvere players
JK Narva Trans players
Eredivisie players
SBV Vitesse players
Eerste Divisie players
FC Emmen players
Veikkausliiga players
Vaasan Palloseura players
Estonia youth international footballers
Estonia under-21 international footballers
Estonia international footballers
Estonian expatriate footballers
Estonian expatriate sportspeople in the Netherlands
Expatriate footballers in the Netherlands
Estonian expatriate sportspeople in Finland
Expatriate footballers in Finland